Dust of Dreams may refer to:

 Dust of Dreams (novel), a novel in the series Malazan Book of the Fallen
 Dust of Dreams (album), a 2005 album by Merzbow